Tasiocera is a genus of crane fly in the family Limoniidae.

Species
Subgenus Dasymolophilus Goetghebuer, 1920
T. aspistes Alexander, 1965
T. basispinosa Alexander, 1979
T. batyle Alexander, 1957
T. biacufera Alexander, 1956
T. boraceae Alexander, 1954
T. brevicornis Alexander, 1929
T. cyrtacantha Alexander, 1958
T. diacanthophora Alexander, 1975
T. dignissima Alexander, 1956
T. eriopteroides (Alexander, 1921)
T. exigua Savchenko, 1973
T. fuscescens (Lackschewitz, 1940)
T. gracilior Alexander, 1958
T. halesus (Schmid, 1949)
T. hova Alexander, 1951
T. jenkinsoni Freeman, 1951
T. jubata (Alexander, 1936)
T. kibunensis (Alexander, 1936)
T. liliputana (Alexander, 1934)
T. malickyiana Mendl, 1985
T. minima Mendl, 1974
T. minutissima Edwards, 1912
T. miseranda Alexander, 1950
T. murina (Meigen, 1818)
T. niphadias (Alexander, 1925)
T. nokoensis (Alexander, 1928)
T. orientalis Edwards, 1928
T. plurispina Alexander, 1960
T. probosa Alexander, 1956
T. propria Alexander, 1956
T. robusta (Bangerter, 1947)
T. squiresi Alexander, 1948
T. subnuda (Alexander, 1926)
T. ursina (Osten Sacken, 1860)
Subgenus Tasiocera Skuse, 1890
T. acanthophallus Alexander, 1931
T. angustistylus Alexander, 1926
T. apheles Alexander, 1961
T. aproducta Alexander, 1952
T. attenuata Alexander, 1926
T. axillaris Alexander, 1926
T. barringtonensis Alexander, 1928
T. bipennata Alexander, 1928
T. bituberculata Alexander, 1924
T. bucephala Alexander, 1931
T. cascadensis Alexander, 1944
T. caudifera Alexander, 1926
T. cervicula Alexander, 1925
T. cyatheti Alexander, 1931
T. diaphana Alexander, 1932
T. dicksoniae Alexander, 1931
T. divaricata Alexander, 1932
T. dorrigensis Alexander, 1928
T. gourlayi (Alexander, 1922)
T. gracilicornis Skuse, 1890
T. hiemalis Alexander, 1931
T. longiana Alexander, 1952
T. nodulifera Alexander, 1937
T. occidentalis Alexander, 1928
T. otwayensis Alexander, 1937
T. papuana Alexander, 1936
T. paulula (Alexander, 1923)
T. pernodulosa Alexander, 1955
T. primaveris Alexander, 1928
T. prolixa Alexander, 1944
T. semiermis Alexander, 1932
T. tarsalba Alexander, 1936
T. taylori Alexander, 1931
T. tenuicornis Skuse, 1890
T. terraereginae Alexander, 1931
T. tonnoirana Alexander, 1932
T. tridentata (Alexander, 1922)
T. triton Alexander, 1925
T. unisetosa Alexander, 1926
T. wilhelminae Alexander, 1961

References

Limoniidae